was a Japanese female waka poet of the early 8th century.

Little is known of her except what is preserved in her 29 surviving poems in the Man'yōshū; all these were love poems addressed to her lover Ōtomo no Yakamochi who compiled the Man'yōshū (and who is known to have had at least 14 other lovers and have broken up with her). Nonetheless, her love poems made her famous and inspired a later generation of female poets like Izumi Shikibu or Ono no Komachi.

Poetry

References
Sources
Page 141 of Women Poets of Japan, 1977, Kenneth Rexroth, Ikuko Atsumi, ; previously published as The Burning Heart by The Seabury Press.
Pages 151-152, 175-176 of Seeds in the Heart
Notes

External links
Manyoshu
Online text of her poems in Japanese

8th-century Japanese women writers
8th-century Japanese writers
Women of medieval Japan
Japanese women poets
8th-century Japanese women
8th-century Japanese people